Thailand competed in the 2008 Summer Olympics, held in Beijing, People's Republic of China, from August 8 to August 24, 2008.

Medalists

Athletics

Men
Track & road events

Women
Track & road events

Field events

Combined events – Heptathlon

Badminton

Boxing

Thailand qualified eight boxers for the Olympic boxing tournament. Five boxers qualified by placing in the top eight at the 2007 World Championships. Petchkoom, Manus Boonjumnong, and Chomphuphuang qualified at the first Asian qualifier.

Cycling

Fencing

Men

Sailing

Men

Women

M = Medal race; EL = Eliminated – did not advance into the medal race; CAN = Race cancelled

Shooting

Men

Women

Swimming

Women

Table tennis

Taekwondo

Tennis

Weightlifting

Men

Women

See also
 Thailand at the 2008 Summer Paralympics

References

Nations at the 2008 Summer Olympics
2008
Summer Olympics